Edward (1284–1329), surnamed the Liberal, was Count of Savoy from 1323 to 1329. He was the son of Amadeus V and his first wife Sybille of Bâgé.

Edward was born at Baugé.  He was married to Blanche, daughter of Duke Robert II of Burgundy and Agnes of France. They had a daughter, Joan, who married Duke John III of Brittany.

In 1325, Edward was attacked at Varey by Guigues VIII of Viennois and Amadeus III of Geneva as he was besieging Varey castle.  Guigues won the battle and Edward barely escaped.

In 1327, the residents of Maurienne revolted against their bishop-prince.  The bishop asked Edward for help, and Edward agreed, provided that he gain the administrative control of the diocese.  The bishop consented, and was restored.  That same year, the bishop of Sion refused to pay him homage, which had been the custom since the time of Peter II, Count of Savoy.  From then on, the bishop and the count paid each other homage on the bridge of Morge.

In 1328, he had wooden aqueducts built to bring fresh water directly into the courtyard of the castle at Chambéry.  His death in 1329 was unexpected, and left the county to his brother, Aymon.

Notes

References
 

1284 births
1329 deaths
14th-century Counts of Savoy
People from Maine-et-Loire
Burials at Hautecombe Abbey